WARA may refer to:

 WARA (AM), a radio station (1320 AM) licensed to Attleboro, Massachusetts, United States
 WARA-FM, a radio station (88.3 FM) licensed to New Washington, Indiana, United States
 Welsh Amateur Rowing Association
 West African Research Center
 Weighted average return on assets, the collective rates of return on the various types of tangible and intangible assets of a company

See also 
 Wara (disambiguation)